East Amana is an unincorporated community and census-designated place (CDP) in Iowa County, Iowa, United States, and is part of the "seven villages" of the Amana Colonies. As of the 2010 Census, the population of East Amana was 56.

According to the website Statistical Atlas, all of the residents of East Amana speak German at home, and only 67.7% can speak English 'Very Well'.

Geography
It sits at the base of hills marking the northern edge of the Iowa River valley.

Demographics

History
In 1881, East Amana contained a blacksmith shop, carpenter shop, and barns in which sheep were kept.

References

Amana Colonies
Unincorporated communities in Iowa
Unincorporated communities in Iowa County, Iowa
Census-designated places in Iowa County, Iowa